Mohamed Benyettou (born November 1, 1989, in Mohammadia, Mascara) is an Algerian football player. He plays primarily as a forward for Al-Wakrah .

Club career

ES Sétif
In June 2014, Benyettou signed a two-year contract with ES Sétif. A month later, he made his debut for the club against Ahly Benghazi in the group stage of the 2014 CAF Champions League, coming on as a 68th-minute substitute for Abdelmalek Ziaya.

Al-Shabab
In January 2016, Benyettou joined Saudi Professional League club Al Shabab.

Honours
ES Sétif
 CAF Champions League (1): 2014
 CAF Super Cup (1): 2015
 Algerian Ligue Professionnelle 1 (1): 2014–15

Individual 
 Qatar Stars League Team of the Year : 2020

References

External links
 
 

1989 births
Algerian expatriate footballers
Algerian expatriate sportspeople in Saudi Arabia
Algerian footballers
Algerian Ligue Professionnelle 1 players
SA Mohammadia players
USM El Harrach players
MC Oran players
ES Sétif players
Al-Shabab FC (Riyadh) players
Fujairah FC players
Al-Wakrah SC players
People from Mascara Province
Living people
People from Mohammadia, Mascara
Saudi Professional League players
UAE Pro League players
Qatar Stars League players
Expatriate footballers in Saudi Arabia
Expatriate footballers in the United Arab Emirates
Algerian expatriate sportspeople in the United Arab Emirates
Expatriate footballers in Qatar
Algerian expatriate sportspeople in Qatar
Association football forwards
21st-century Algerian people